Lilly Turner is a 1933 American pre-Code melodrama directed by William A. Wellman and starring Ruth Chatterton. It was based on the 1932 play of the same name by Phillip Dunning and George Abbott.

Plot
A woman who marries a bigamist, then a drunk, and falls in love with another man, all while working at a carnival.

Cast
 Ruth Chatterton as Lilly Turner
 George Brent as Bob Chandler
 Frank McHugh as Dave Dixon
 Guy Kibbee as Doc Peter McGill
 Robert Barrat as Fritz
 Ruth Donnelly as Edna Yokum
 Marjorie Gateson as Mrs. McGill
 Gordon Westcott as Rex Durkee
 Arthur Vinton as Sam Waxman
 Grant Mitchell as Dr. Hawley
 Margaret Seddon as Mrs. Turner
 Mae Busch as Hazel

References

External links
 
 
 
 

1933 romantic drama films
1933 films
American black-and-white films
Circus films
American films based on plays
Films directed by William A. Wellman
American romantic drama films
Warner Bros. films
First National Pictures films
Melodrama films
Films with screenplays by Kathryn Scola
1930s American films